HMF may refer to:
 HandMade Films, a British film company
 Hannah Montana Forever (Hannah Montana season 4)
 His or Her Majesty's Frigate, a ship prefix; see Her Majesty's Ship
 HMF Engineering, a manufacturer of exhaust systems
 Hmong Don language, spoken in Vietnam
 Human milk fortifier
 Hydroxymethylfurfural, an organic compound derived from dehydration of certain sugars
 Hypergol Maintenance Facility, at the Kennedy Space Center in Florida, United States
 Norrlandsflyg, a Swedish helicopter operator